A. T. Krishnaswamy (1905–1987) was an Indian director best known for the film Sabapathy.

Career 
Krishnaswamy joined the A. V. Meiyappan unit as an assistant during the mid-1930s and worked on all AVM projects. He made his directorial debut with Sabapathy (1941) and later left AVM for personal reasons. Krishnasami made films such as Vidyapathi and Manam Oru Kurangu. His most successful film was Arivaali, but his own success was shortlived. His later days were spent in obscurity, and he died on the same day as M. G. Ramachandran in 1987.

Filmography

References

External links 
 

Indian film directors
Tamil film directors

1905 births
1987 deaths